Tigre Noir Football Club is a football club based in Bujumbura, Burundi. The men's team plays in the Burundi Ligue A.

Colours and badge 
Tigre Noir FC's colors are black and white.

The Tigre Noir FC badge has the words, "Force, Determination, Success" an image of a flaming tiger,a football, and the club's date of inception.

Stadium 
Tigre Noir FC plays their home matches at Prince Louis Rwagasore Stadium.
The stadium has a capacity of 10,000. It is renamed on 1 July 2019 after former Burundian prime minister and independence hero, Louis Rwagasore. It was formerly known as Stade Intwari.

Squad

Management and staff

References 

Football clubs in Burundi
Bujumbura